Sam Retrosi (born December 12, 1985) is an American luger who competed as at the international level from 2000 to 2007. She competed in the women's singles event at the 2006 Winter Olympics in Turin.

During her second run at Turin, Retrosi crashed on the Cesana Pariol track when she approached one of the curves at the bottom of the track. Suffering from a concussion and cuts to her left knee and chin, Retrosi was taken by ambulance to a nearby hospital, then flown to another hospital in Turin for further evaluation. The Saranac Lake, New York native announced her retirement from luge in June 2007.

Samantha is a current doctoral student in sociology at George Mason University. Her PhD research was conducted in the Fall of 2017 in the Peruvian Amazon and is focused upon the therapeutic benefits of ayahuasca as applied to Western participants within the Shipibo healing tradition. Her previous work focused on the political economy of global sport, during which she wrote a piece for The Nation criticising the Olympic Games as a site of globalized exploitation of athletes and host city residents.

References

 2006 luge women's singles results
 FIL-Luge.org June 13, 2007 announcement of Retrosi's retirement
 FIL-Luge profile: Retrosi, Samantha
 Torino 2006 profile
 USA Today February 13, 2006 article on Retrosi's second run crash during he 2006 Winter Olympics at Turin
 USA Today February 14, 2006 article on Retrosi's release from the hospital following her crash at the 2006 Winter Olympics in Turin
 USA Luge.org profile
 United States Olympic Committee press release of February 13, 2006 on Retrosi's condition following her crash at the 2006 Winter Olympics
 United States Olympic Committee profile

External links
 
 

1985 births
Living people
American female lugers
Olympic lugers of the United States
Lugers at the 2006 Winter Olympics
People from Saranac Lake, New York
21st-century American women